John Petersen (born 22 April 1972) is a retired Faroese football striker and the current manager for the Faroe Islands women's national football team.

Club career
A prolific striker, Petersen has won Faroese league winner medals with GÍ Gøta and B36 Tórshavn. He then moved to play with compatriots Jens Martin Knudsen, Sámal Joensen and Jens Erik Rasmussen at Leiftur in the Icelandic league only to return to the Faroe Islands after a disappointing season in which the team relegated. Petersen was Faroese league top goalscorer in the 1994 season. He also had a short spell with Danish sides Holstebro BK and Skive IK. John Petersen is the second most scoring footballer in the Faroese league, with 147 goals.

International career
Petersen made his debut for the Faroe Islands in an October 1995 European Championship qualifying match against San Marino, coming on as a substitute for Todi Jónsson. On 7 September 2002, Petersen scored 2 goals within the first 8 minutes in a European Championship qualifying match, to give the Faroe Islands a 2–0 lead against Scotland. Given the chance to extend Faroe Islands lead to 3-0 after half time, alone with the goalie, Petersens attempt went above the post, as the ball hit a trench before impact. The final score ended 2-2. He has collected 57 caps since, scoring eight goals. He is also the seventh most capped player for the Faroe Islands national side.

International goals
Scores and results list Faroe Islands' goal tally first.

Manager career 
Petersen was head coach of B36 Tórshavn in 2011. He was coach of Skála ÍF for one and a half years in 2007 and 2008. He was assisting coach for AB Argir in 2009 and assisting coach for Viborg FF in 2007. Petersen was assisting coach for Faroe Islands national football team in the period 2006 to 2008. He was the head coach of the Faroe Islands U19 women's national team. and since January 2019 he has been the head coach for the Faroe Islands women's national football team.

Handball career 
Petersen has played on the national handball team of the Faroe Islands. He played for the clubs StÍF and Neistin.

References

External links
 
 Profile at B68

1972 births
Living people
Faroese footballers
Faroe Islands international footballers
Skive IK players
Holstebro BK players
Faroese football managers
B36 Tórshavn players
John Petersen
Expatriate footballers in Iceland
Faroese male handball players
GÍ Gøta players
B36 Tórshavn managers
Association football forwards